Ben 10: Ultimate Alien – Cosmic Destruction is a 2010 video game based on Ben 10: Ultimate Alien and is the fifth game in the Ben 10 video games series released for the Xbox 360, PlayStation 3, PlayStation 2, Wii, PlayStation Portable and Nintendo DS on October 5, 2010.

Overview
Ben 10 Ultimate Alien: Cosmic Destruction introduces the new alien heroes and challenging puzzle elements. Players control Ben and up to 16 alien heroes including Ultimate Big Chill, Ultimate Spidermonkey, Ultimate Echo Echo, Ultimate Swampfire, Ultimate Humungousaur, Four Arms (PS3) and Rath (Xbox 360).

The game involves Ben traveling to iconic real-world locations in search of the parts to an ancient Galvan artifact called the Potis Altiare to save the Earth from total destruction by an evil To'kustar.

Reception

The game was given mixed reviews, being criticized for its limited length, game mechanics, as well as several gameplay and design concepts. Fans, however, consider this an improvement over past games in the franchise, especially the transformation and combat mechanics having a smoother flow than before.

References

External links
 Ben 10 Ultimate Alien: Cosmic Destruction at Internet Movie Database

Video games based on Ben 10
2010 video games
D3 Publisher games
Ben 10
Nintendo DS games
Video games developed in the United States
PlayStation Portable games
PlayStation 2 games
PlayStation 3 games
Wii games
Xbox 360 games
Griptonite Games
Superhero video games
Video games using Havok
Video games set in Brazil
Video games set in China
Video games set in Rome
Video games set in Tokyo
Video games set in Paris
Video games set in Wyoming
Single-player video games
Cartoon Network video games
Papaya Studio games